The 1979 Idaho State Bengals football team represented the Idaho State University as a member of the Big Sky Conference during the 1979 NCAA Division I-AA football season. Led by Bud Hake in his third and final season as head coach, the Bengals compiled an overall record of 0–11 with mark of 0–7 in conference play, placing last out of eight team in the Big Sky. Idaho State extended the program's losing streak to 16 games, dating back to the previous season. The team played home games on campus at the ASISU Minidome in Pocatello, Idaho.

After the final game of the season, Hake resigned as head coach, with a  record in three seasons.

Schedule

References

Idaho State
Idaho State Bengals football seasons
College football winless seasons
Idaho State Bengals football